Learning disability, learning disorder, or learning difficulty (British English) is a condition in the brain that causes difficulties comprehending or processing information and can be caused by several different factors.  Given the "difficulty learning in a typical manner", this does not exclude the ability to learn in a different manner. Therefore, some people can be more accurately described as having a "learning difference", thus avoiding any misconception of being disabled with a lack of ability to learn and possible negative stereotyping. In the United Kingdom, the term "learning disability" generally refers to an intellectual disability, while conditions such as dyslexia and dyspraxia are usually referred to as "learning difficulties".

While learning disability and learning disorder are often used interchangeably, they differ in many ways. Disorder refers to significant learning problems in an academic area. These problems, however, are not enough to warrant an official diagnosis. Learning disability, on the other hand, is an official clinical diagnosis, whereby the individual meets certain criteria, as determined by a professional (such as a psychologist, psychiatrist, speech language pathologist, or pediatrician). The difference is in degree, frequency, and intensity of reported symptoms and problems, and thus the two should not be confused. When the term "learning disorder" is used, it describes a group of disorders characterized by inadequate development of specific academic, language, and speech skills. Types of learning disorders include reading (dyslexia), arithmetic (dyscalculia) and writing (dysgraphia).

The unknown factor is the disorder that affects the brain's ability to receive and process information. This disorder can make it problematic for a person to learn as quickly or in the same way as someone who is not affected by a learning disability. People with a learning disability have trouble performing specific types of skills or completing tasks if left to figure things out by themselves or if taught in conventional ways.

Individuals with learning disabilities can face unique challenges that are often pervasive throughout the lifespan. Depending on the type and severity of the disability, interventions, and current technologies may be used to help the individual learn strategies that will foster future success. Some interventions can be quite simplistic, while others are intricate and complex. Current technologies may require student training to be effective classroom supports. Teachers, parents, and schools can create plans together that tailor intervention and accommodations to aid the individuals in successfully becoming independent learners. A multi-disciplinary team frequently helps to design the intervention and to coordinate the execution of the intervention with teachers and parents. This team frequently includes school psychologists, special educators, speech therapists (pathologists), occupational therapists, psychologists, ESL teachers, literacy coaches, and/or reading specialists.

Definition
Representatives of organizations committed to the education and welfare of individuals with learning disabilities are known as National Joint Committee on Learning Disabilities (NJCLD). The NJCLD used the term 'learning disability' to indicate a discrepancy between a child's apparent capacity to learn and their level of achievement. Several difficulties existed, however, with the NJCLD standard of defining learning disability. One such difficulty was its belief of central nervous system dysfunction as a basis of understanding and diagnosing learning disability. This conflicted with the fact that many individuals who experienced central nervous system dysfunction, such as those with cerebral palsy, did not experience disabilities in learning. On the other hand, those individuals who experienced multiple handicapping conditions along with learning disability frequently received inappropriate assessment, planning, and instruction. The NJCLD notes that it is possible for learning disability to occur simultaneously with other handicapping conditions, however, the two should not be directly linked together or confused.
In the 1980s, NJCLD, therefore, defined the term learning disability as: 

The 2002 LD Roundtable produced the following definition:The issue of defining learning disabilities has generated significant and ongoing controversy. The term "learning disability" does not exist in DSM-IV, but it has been added to the DSM-5. The DSM-5 does not limit learning disorders to a particular diagnosis such as reading, mathematics, or written expression. Instead, it is a single diagnosis criterion describing drawbacks in general academic skills and includes detailed specifiers for the areas of reading, mathematics, and written expression.

United States and Canada
In the United States and Canada, the terms learning disability and learning disorder (LD) refer to a group of disorders that affect a broad range of academic and functional skills including the ability to speak, listen, read, write, spell, reason, organize information, and do math. People with learning disabilities generally have intelligence that is average or higher.

Legislation in the United States
The Section 504 of the Rehabilitation Act 1973, effective May 1977, guarantees certain rights to people with disabilities, especially in the cases of education and work, such being in schools, colleges and university settings.

The Individuals with Disabilities Education Act, formerly known as the Education for All Handicapped Children Act, is a United States federal law that governs how states and public agencies provide early intervention, special education and related services to children with disabilities. It addresses the educational needs of children with disabilities from birth to the age of 21. Considered as a civil rights law, states are not required to participate.

Canada
In Canada, the first association in support of children with learning disabilities was founded in 1962 by a group of concerned parents. Originally called the Association for Children with Learning Disabilities, the Learning Disabilities Association of Canada – LDAC was created to provide awareness and services for individuals with learning disabilities, their families, at work, and the community. Since education is largely the responsibility of each province and territory in Canada, provinces and territories have jurisdiction over the education of individuals with learning disabilities, which allows the development of policies and support programs that reflect the unique multicultural, linguistic, and socioeconomic conditions of its area.

United Kingdom
In the UK, terms such as specific learning difficulty (SpLD), developmental dyslexia, developmental coordination disorder and dyscalculia are used to cover the range of learning difficulties referred to in the United States as "learning disabilities". In the UK, the term "learning disability" refers to a range of developmental disabilities or conditions that are almost invariably associated with more severe generalized cognitive impairment. The Lancet defines 'learning disability' as a "significant general impairment in intellectual functioning acquired during childhood", and states that roughly one in 50 British adults have one.

Japan
In Japan, acknowledgement and support for students with learning disabilities has been a fairly recent development, and has improved drastically since the start of the 21st Century. The first definition for learning disability was coined in 1999, and in 2001, the Enrichment Project for the Support System for Students with Learning Disabilities was established. Since then, there have been significant efforts to screen children for learning disabilities, provide follow-up support, and provide networking between schools and specialists.

Effects
The effects of having a learning disability or learning difference are not limited to educational outcomes: individuals with learning disabilities may experience social problems as well. Neuropsychological differences can affect the accurate perception of social cues with peers. Researchers argue persons with learning disabilities not only experience negative effects as a result of their learning distinctions, but also as a result of carrying a stigmatizing label. It has generally been difficult to determine the efficacy of special education services because of data and methodological limitations. Emerging research suggests adolescents with learning disabilities experience poorer academic outcomes even compared to peers who began high school with similar levels of achievement and comparable behaviors. It seems their poorer outcomes may be at least partially due to the lower expectations of their teachers; national data show teachers hold expectations for students labeled with learning disabilities that are inconsistent with their academic potential (as evidenced by test scores and learning behaviors). It has been said that there is a strong connection between children with a learning disability and their educational performance.

Many studies have been done to assess the correlation between learning disability and self-esteem. These studies have shown that an individual's self-esteem is indeed affected by their own awareness of their learning disability. Students with a positive perception of their academic abilities generally tend to have higher self-esteem than those who do not, regardless of their actual academic achievement. However, studies have also shown that several other factors can influence self-esteem. Skills in non-academic areas, such as athletics and arts, improve self-esteem. Also, a positive perception of one's physical appearance has also been shown to have positive effects of self-esteem. Another important finding is that students with learning disabilities are able to distinguish between academic skill and intellectual capacity. This demonstrates that students who acknowledge their academic limitations but are also aware of their potential to succeed in other intellectual tasks see themselves as intellectually competent individuals, which increases their self-esteem.

Research involving individuals with learning disabilities who exhibit challenging behaviors who are subsequently treated with antipsychotic medications provides little evidence that any benefits outweigh the risk.

Causes
The causes for learning disabilities are not well understood, and sometimes there is no apparent cause for a learning disability. However, some causes of neurological impairments include:
Heredity and genetics: Learning disabilities are often linked through genetics and run in the family. Children who have learning disabilities often have parents who have the same struggles. Children of parents who had less than 12 years of school are more likely to have a reading disability. Some children have spontaneous mutations (i.e. not present in either parent) which can cause developmental disorders including learning disabilities. One study estimated that about one in 300 children had such spontaneous mutations, for example a fault in the CDK13 gene which is associated with learning and communication difficulties in the children affected.
Problems during pregnancy and birth: A learning disability can result from anomalies in the developing brain, illness or injury. Risk factors are fetal exposure to alcohol or drugs and low birth weight (3 pounds or less). These children are more likely to develop a disability in math or reading. Children who are born prematurely, late, have a longer labor than usual, or have trouble receiving oxygen are more likely to develop a learning disability.
Accidents after birth: Learning disabilities can also be caused by head injuries, malnutrition, or by toxic exposure (such as heavy metals or pesticides).

Diagnosis

IQ-achievement discrepancy
Learning disabilities can be identified by psychiatrists, speech language pathologists, school psychologists, clinical psychologists, counseling psychologists, neuropsychologists, speech language pathologists, and other learning disability specialists through a combination of intelligence testing, academic achievement testing, classroom performance, and social interaction and aptitude. Other areas of assessment may include perception, cognition, memory, attention, and language abilities. The resulting information is used to determine whether a child's academic performance is commensurate with their cognitive ability. If a child's cognitive ability is much higher than their academic performance, the student is often diagnosed with a learning disability. The DSM-IV and many school systems and government programs diagnose learning disabilities in this way (DSM-IV uses the term "disorder" rather than "disability").

Although the discrepancy model has dominated the school system for many years, there has been substantial criticism of this approach among researchers. Recent research has provided little evidence that a discrepancy between formally measured IQ and achievement is a clear indicator of LD. Furthermore, diagnosing on the basis of a discrepancy does not predict the effectiveness of treatment. Low academic achievers who do not have a discrepancy with IQ (i.e. their IQ scores are also low) appear to benefit from treatment just as much as low academic achievers who do have a discrepancy with IQ (i.e. their IQ scores are higher than their academic performance would suggest).

Since 1998 there have been attempts to create a reference index more useful than IQ to generate predicted scores on achievement tests. For example, for a student whose vocabulary and general knowledge scores matches their reading comprehension score a teacher could assume that reading comprehension can be supported through work in vocabulary and general knowledge. If the reading comprehension score is lower in the appropriate statistical sense it would be necessary to first rule out things like vision problems

Response to intervention
Much current research has focused on a treatment-oriented diagnostic process known as response to intervention (RTI). Researcher recommendations for implementing such a model include early screening for all students, placing those students who are having difficulty into research-based early intervention programs, rather than waiting until they meet diagnostic criteria. Their performance can be closely monitored to determine whether increasingly intense intervention results in adequate progress. Those who respond will not require further intervention. Those who do not respond adequately to regular classroom instruction (often called "Tier 1 instruction") and a more intensive intervention (often called "Tier 2" intervention) are considered "non-responders." These students can then be referred for further assistance through special education, in which case they are often identified with a learning disability. Some models of RTI include a third tier of intervention before a child is identified as having a learning disability.

A primary benefit of such a model is that it would not be necessary to wait for a child to be sufficiently far behind to qualify for assistance. This may enable more children to receive assistance before experiencing significant failure, which may, in turn, result in fewer children who need intensive and expensive special education services. In the United States, the 2004 reauthorization of the Individuals with Disabilities Education Act permitted states and school districts to use RTI as a method of identifying students with learning disabilities. RTI is now the primary means of identification of learning disabilities in Florida.

The process does not take into account children's individual neuropsychological factors such as phonological awareness and memory, that can inform design instruction. By not taking into account specific cognitive processes, RTI fails to inform educators about a students' relative strengths and weaknesses Second, RTI by design takes considerably longer than established techniques, often many months to find an appropriate tier of intervention. Third, it requires a strong intervention program before students can be identified with a learning disability. Lastly, RTI is considered a regular education initiative and consists of members of general education teachers, in conjunction with other qualified professionals. Occupational therapists in particular can support students in the educational setting by helping children in academic and non-academic areas of school including the classroom, recess and meal time. They can provide strategies, therapeutic interventions, suggestions for adaptive equipment, and environmental modifications. Occupational therapists can work closely with the child's teacher and parents to facilitate educational goals specific to each child under an RTI and/or IEP.

Latino English language learners
Demographers in the United States report that there has been a significant increase in immigrant children in the United States over the past two decades. This information is vital because it has been and will continue to affect both students and how educators approach teaching methods. Various teaching strategies are more successful for students that are linguistic or culturally diverse versus traditional methods of teaching used for students whose first language is English. It is then also true that the proper way to diagnose a learning disability in English language learners (ELL) differs. In the United States, there has been a growing need to develop the knowledge and skills necessary to provide effective school psychological services, specifically for those professionals who work with immigrant populations.

Currently, there are no standardized guidelines for the process of diagnosing ELL with specific learning disabilities (SLD). This is a problem since many students will fall through the cracks as educators are unable to clearly assess if a student's delay is due to a language barrier or true learning disability. With an unclear diagnosis, many students will suffer because they will not be provided with the tools they need to succeed in the public education school system. For example, in many occasions teachers have suggested retention or have taken no action at all when they lack experience working with English language learners. Students were commonly pushed toward testing, based on an assumption that their poor academic performance or behavioral difficulties indicated a need for special education. Linguistically responsive psychologist understand that second language acquisition is a process and they understand how to support ELLs' growth in language and academically. When ELLs are referred for a psychoeducational assessment, it is difficult to isolate and disentangle what are the effects of the language acquisition process, from poor quality educational services, from what may be academic difficulties that result from processing disorders, attention problems, and learning disabilities. Additionally not having trained staff and faculty becomes more of an issue when staff is unaware of numerous types of psychological factors that immigrant children in the U.S dealing could be potentially dealing with. These factors that include acculturation, fear and/or worry of deportation, separation from social supports such as parents, language barriers, disruptions in learning experiences, stigmatization, economic challenge, and risk factors associated with poverty. In the United States, there are no set policies mandating that all districts employ bilingual school psychologist, nor are schools equipped with specific tools and resources to assist immigrant children and families. Many school districts do not have the proper personnel that is able to communicate with this population.

Spanish-speaking ELL
A well trained bilingual school psychologist will be able to administer and interpret assessment all psychological testing tool. Also, an emphasis is placed on informal assessment measures such as language samples, observations, interviews, and rating scales as well as curriculum-based measurement to complement information gathered from formal assessments. A compilation of these tests is used to assess whether an ELL student has a learning disability or merely is academically delayed because of language barriers or environmental factor. Many schools do not have a school psychologist with the proper training nor access to appropriate tools. Also, many school districts frown upon taking the appropriate steps to diagnosing ELL students.

Assessment
Many normed assessments can be used in evaluating skills in the primary academic domains: reading, including word recognition, fluency, and comprehension; mathematics, including computation and problem solving; and written expression, including handwriting, spelling and composition.

The most commonly used comprehensive achievement tests include the Woodcock-Johnson IV (WJ IV), Wechsler Individual Achievement Test II (WIAT II), the Wide Range Achievement Test III (WRAT III), and the Stanford Achievement Test–10th edition. These tests include measures of many academic domains that are reliable in identifying areas of difficulty.

In the reading domain, there are also specialized tests that can be used to obtain details about specific reading deficits. Assessments that measure multiple domains of reading include Gray's Diagnostic Reading Tests–2nd edition (GDRT II) and the Stanford Diagnostic Reading Assessment. Assessments that measure reading subskills include the Gray Oral Reading Test IV – Fourth Edition (GORT IV), Gray Silent Reading Test, Comprehensive Test of Phonological Processing (CTOPP), Tests of Oral Reading and Comprehension Skills (TORCS), Test of Reading Comprehension 3 (TORC-3), Test of Word Reading Efficiency (TOWRE), and the Test of Reading Fluency. A more comprehensive list of reading assessments may be obtained from the Southwest Educational Development Laboratory.

The purpose of assessment is to determine what is needed for intervention, which also requires consideration of contextual variables and whether there are comorbid disorders that must also be identified and treated, such as behavioral issues or language delays. These contextual variables are often assessed using parent and teacher questionnaire forms that rate the students' behaviors and compares them to standardized norms.

However, caution should be made when suspecting the person with a learning disability may also have dementia, especially as people with Down's syndrome may have the neuroanatomical profile but not the associated clinical signs and symptoms. Examination can be carried out of executive functioning as well as social and cognitive abilities but may need adaptation of standardized tests to take account of special needs.

Types
Learning disabilities can be categorized by either the type of information processing affected by the disability or by the specific difficulties caused by a processing deficit.

By stage of information processing
Learning disabilities fall into broad categories based on the four stages of information processing used in learning: input, integration, storage, and output. Many learning disabilities are a compilation of a few types of abnormalities occurring at the same time, as well as with social difficulties and emotional or behavioral disorders. 
 Input: This is the information perceived through the senses, such as visual and auditory perception. Difficulties with visual perception can cause problems with recognizing the shape, position, or size of items seen. There can be problems with sequencing, which can relate to deficits with processing time intervals or temporal perception. Difficulties with auditory perception can make it difficult to screen out competing sounds in order to focus on one of them, such as the sound of the teacher's voice in a classroom setting. Some children appear to be unable to process tactile input. For example, they may seem insensitive to pain or dislike being touched.
 Integration: This is the stage during which perceived input is interpreted, categorized, placed in a sequence, or related to previous learning. Students with problems in these areas may be unable to tell a story in the correct sequence, unable to memorize sequences of information such as the days of the week, able to understand a new concept but be unable to generalize it to other areas of learning, or able to learn facts but be unable to put the facts together to see the "big picture." A poor vocabulary may contribute to problems with comprehension.
 Storage: Problems with memory can occur with short-term or working memory, or with long-term memory. Most memory difficulties occur with one's short-term memory, which can make it difficult to learn new material without more repetitions than usual. Difficulties with visual memory can impede learning to spell.
 Output: Information comes out of the brain either through words, that is, language output, or through muscle activity, such as gesturing, writing or drawing. Difficulties with language output can create problems with spoken language. Such difficulties include answering a question on demand, in which one must retrieve information from storage, organize our thoughts, and put the thoughts into words before we speak. It can also cause trouble with written language for the same reasons. Difficulties with motor abilities can cause problems with gross and fine motor skills. People with gross motor difficulties may be clumsy, that is, they may be prone to stumbling, falling, or bumping into things. They may also have trouble running, climbing, or learning to ride a bicycle. People with fine motor difficulties may have trouble with handwriting, buttoning shirts, or tying shoelaces.

By function impaired
Deficits in any area of information processing can manifest in a variety of specific learning disabilities. It is possible for an individual to have more than one of these difficulties. This is referred to as comorbidity or co-occurrence of learning disabilities. In the UK, the term dual diagnosis is often used to refer to co-occurrence of learning difficulties.

Reading disorder (ICD-10 and DSM-IV codes: F81.0/315.00)
Reading disorder is the most common learning disability. Of all students with specific learning disabilities, 70–80% have deficits in reading. The term "Developmental Dyslexia" is often used as a synonym for reading disability; however, many researchers assert that there are different types of reading disabilities, of which dyslexia is one. A reading disability can affect any part of the reading process, including difficulty with accurate or fluent word recognition, or both, word decoding, reading rate, prosody (oral reading with expression), and reading comprehension. Before the term "dyslexia" came to prominence, this learning disability used to be known as "word blindness."

Common indicators of reading disability include difficulty with phonemic awareness—the ability to break up words into their component sounds, and difficulty with matching letter combinations to specific sounds (sound-symbol correspondence).

Disorder of written expression (ICD-10 and DSM-IV-TR codes 315.2)

The DSM-IV-TR criteria for a disorder of written expression is writing skills (as measured by a standardized test or functional assessment) that fall substantially below those expected based on the individual's chronological age, measured intelligence, and age-appropriate education, (Criterion A). This difficulty must also cause significant impairment to academic achievement and tasks that require composition of written text (Criterion B), and if a sensory deficit is present, the difficulties with writing skills must exceed those typically associated with the sensory deficit, (Criterion C).

Individuals with a diagnosis of a disorder of written expression typically have a combination of difficulties in their abilities with written expression as evidenced by grammatical and punctuation errors within sentences, poor paragraph organization, multiple spelling errors, and excessively poor penmanship. A disorder in spelling or handwriting without other difficulties of written expression do not generally qualify for this diagnosis. If poor handwriting is due to an impairment in the individuals' motor coordination, a diagnosis of developmental coordination disorder should be considered.

By a number of organizations, the term "dysgraphia" has been used as an overarching term for all disorders of written expression.

Math disability (ICD-10 and DSM-IV codes F81.2-3/315.1)

Sometimes called dyscalculia, a math disability involves difficulties such as learning math concepts (such as quantity, place value, and time), difficulty memorizing math facts, difficulty organizing numbers, and understanding how problems are organized on the page. Dyscalculics are often referred to as having poor "number sense".

Non ICD-10/DSM
 Nonverbal learning disability: Nonverbal learning disabilities often manifest in motor clumsiness, poor visual-spatial skills, problematic social relationships, difficulty with mathematics, and poor organizational skills. These individuals often have specific strengths in the verbal domains, including early speech, large vocabulary, early reading and spelling skills, excellent rote memory and auditory retention, and eloquent self-expression.
 Disorders of speaking and listening: Difficulties that often co-occur with learning disabilities include difficulty with memory, social skills and executive functions (such as organizational skills and time management).

Management

Interventions include:
Mastery model:
Learners work at their own level of mastery.
Practice
Gain fundamental skills before moving onto the next level
Note: this approach is most likely to be used with adult learners or outside the mainstream school system.
Direct instruction:
Emphasizes carefully planned lessons for small learning increments
Scripted lesson plans
Rapid-paced interaction between teacher and students
Correcting mistakes immediately
Achievement-based grouping
Frequent progress assessments
Classroom adjustments:
Special seating assignments
Alternative or modified assignments
Modified testing procedures
Quiet environment
Special equipment:
Word processors with spell checkers and dictionaries
Text-to-speech and speech-to-text programs
Talking calculators
Books on tape
Computer-based activities
Classroom assistants:
Note-takers
Readers
Proofreaders
Scribes
Special education:
Prescribed hours in a resource room
Placement in a resource room
Enrollment in a special school or a separate classroom in a regular school for learning disabled students
Individual education plan (IEP)
Educational therapy
Sternberg has argued that early remediation can greatly reduce the number of children meeting diagnostic criteria for learning disabilities. He has also suggested that the focus on learning disabilities and the provision of accommodations in school fails to acknowledge that people have a range of strengths and weaknesses, and places undue emphasis on academic success by insisting that people should receive additional support in this arena but not in music or sports. Other research has pinpointed the use of resource rooms as an important—yet often politicized component of educating students with learning disabilities.

Society and culture

School laws
Schools in the United States have a legal obligation to new arrivals to the country, including undocumented students. The landmark Supreme Court ruling Plyler v. Doe (1982) grants all children, no matter their legal status, the right to a free education. This ruling suggests that as a country we acknowledge that we have a population of students with specific needs that differ from those of native speakers. Additionally specifically in regards to ELL's the supreme court ruling Lau v. Nichols (1974) stated that equal treatment in school did not mean equal educational opportunity. Thus if a school teaches a lesson in a language that students do not understand then they are effectively worthless. This ruling is also supported by English language development services provided in schools, but these rulings do not require the individuals that teach and provide services to have any specific training nor is licensing different from a typical teacher or services provider.

Critique of the medical model
Learning disability theory is founded in the medical model of disability, in that disability is perceived as an individual deficit that is biological in origin. Researchers working within a social model of disability assert that there are social or structural causes of disability or the assignation of the label of disability, and even that disability is entirely socially constructed. Since the turn of the 19th century, education in the United States has been geared toward producing citizens who can effectively contribute to a capitalistic society, with a cultural premium on efficiency and science. More agrarian cultures, for example, do not even use learning ability as a measure of adult adequacy, whereas the diagnosis of learning disabilities is prevalent in Western capitalistic societies because of the high value placed on speed, literacy, and numeracy in both the labor force and school system.

Culture
There are three patterns that are well known in regards to mainstream students and minority labels in the United States:
 "A higher percentage of minority children than of white children are assigned to special education";
 "within special education, white children are assigned to less restrictive programs than are their minority counterparts";
 "the data — driven by inconsistent methods of diagnosis, treatment, and funding — make the overall system difficult to describe or change".
In the present day, it has been reported that white districts have more children from minority backgrounds enrolled in special education than they do majority students. "It was also suggested that districts with a higher percentage of minority faculty had fewer minority students placed in special education suggesting that 'minority students are treated differently in predominantly white districts than in predominantly minority districts'".

Educators have only recently started to look into the effects of culture on learning disabilities. If a teacher ignores a student's culturally diverse background, the student will suffer in the class. "The cultural repertoires of students from cultural learning disorder backgrounds have an impact on their learning, school progress, and behavior in the classroom". These students may then act out and not excel in the classroom and will, therefore, be misdiagnosed: "Overall, the data indicates that there is a persistent concern regarding the misdiagnosis and inappropriate placement of students from diverse backgrounds in special education classes since the 1975".

Social roots of learning disabilities in the U.S.
Learning disabilities have a disproportionate identification of racial and ethnic minorities and students who have low socioeconomic status (SES). While some attribute the disproportionate identification of racial/ethnic minorities to racist practices or cultural misunderstanding, others have argued that racial/ethnic minorities are overidentified because of their lower status. Similarities were noted between the behaviors of "brain-injured" and lower class students as early as the 1960s. The distinction between race/ethnicity and SES is important to the extent that these considerations contribute to the provision of services to children in need.
While many studies have considered only one characteristic of the student at a time, or used district- or school-level data to examine this issue, more recent studies have used large national student-level datasets and sophisticated methodology to find that the disproportionate identification of African American students with learning disabilities can be attributed to their average lower SES, while the disproportionate identification of Latino youth seems to be attributable to difficulties in distinguishing between linguistic proficiency and learning ability. Although the contributing factors are complicated and interrelated, it is possible to discern which factors really drive disproportionate identification by considering a multitude of student characteristics simultaneously. For instance, if high SES minorities have rates of identification that are similar to the rates among high SES Whites, and low SES minorities have rates of identification that are similar to the rates among low SES Whites, we can know that the seemingly higher rates of identification among minorities result from their greater likelihood to have low SES. Summarily, because the risk of identification for White students who have low SES is similar to that of Black students who have low SES, future research and policy reform should focus on identifying the shared qualities or experiences of low SES youth that lead to their disproportionate identification, rather than focusing exclusively on racial/ethnic minorities. It remains to be determined why lower SES youth are at higher risk of incidence, or possibly just of identification, with learning disabilities.

Learning disabilities in adulthood 
A common misconception about those with learning disabilities is that they outgrow it as they enter adulthood. This is often not the case and most adults with learning disabilities still require resources and care to help manage their disability. One resource available is the Adult Basic Education (ABE) programs, at the state level. ABE programs are allotted certain amounts of funds per state in order to provide resources for adults with learning disabilities. This includes resources to help them learn basic life skills in order to provide for themselves. ABE programs also provide help for adults who lack a high school diploma or an equivalent. These programs teach skills to help adults get into the workforce or into a further level of education. There is a certain pathway that these adults and instructors should follow in order to ensure these adults have the abilities needed to succeed in life. Some ABE programs offer GED preparation programs to support adults through the process to get a GED. It is important to note that ABE programs do not always have the expected outcome on things like employment. Participants in ABE programs are given tools to help them succeed and get a job but, employment is dependent on more than just a guarantee of a job post-ABE. Employment varies based on the level of growth a participant experiences in an ABE program, the personality and behavior of the participant, and the job market they are entering into following completion of an ABE program.

Another program to assist adults with disabilities are federal programs called "home and community based services" (HCBS). Medicaid funds these programs for many people through a fee waiver system, however, there are still lots of people on a stand-by list. These programs are primarily used for adults with Autism Spectrum Disorders. HCBS programs offer service more dedicated to caring for the adult, not so much providing resources for them to transition into the workforce. Some services provided are: therapy, social skills training, support groups, and counseling.

Contrast with other conditions
People with an IQ lower than 70 are usually characterized as having an intellectual disability and are not included under most definitions of learning disabilities because their difficulty in learning are considered to be related directly to their overall low intelligence.

Attention-deficit hyperactivity disorder (ADHD) is often studied in connection with learning disabilities, but it is not actually included in the standard definitions of learning disabilities. Individuals with ADHD may struggle with learning, but can often learn adequately once successfully treated for the ADHD. A person can have ADHD but not learning disabilities or have learning disabilities without having ADHD. The conditions can co-occur.

People diagnosed with ADHD sometimes have impaired learning. Some of the struggles people with ADHD have might include lack of motivation, high levels of anxiety, and the inability to process information. There are studies that suggest people with ADHD generally have a positive attitude toward academics and, with medication and developed study skills, can perform just as well as individuals without learning disabilities. Also, using alternate sources of gathering information, such as websites, study groups and learning centers, can help a person with ADHD be academically successful.

Before the discovery of ADHD, it was technically included in the definition of LDs since it has a very pronounced effect on the "executive functions" required for learning. Thus historically, ADHD was not clearly distinguished from other disabilities related to learning. Therefore, when a person presents with difficulties in learning, ADHD should be considered as well. Scientific research continues to explore the traits, struggles, effective learning styles and comorbid LDs of those with ADHD.

References

Further reading
 
 
 
 
 
 Hay I, Elias G, Fielding-Barnsley R, Homel R, Freiberg K (2007). "Language delays, reading delays, and learning difficulties: interactive elements requiring multidimensional programming". Journal of Learning Disabilities. 40 (5): 400–9. doi:10.1177/00222194070400050301. PMID 17915494. S2CID 21854907
 
 
 
 Rodis, P., Garrod, A., & Boscardin, M. L. (Eds.). (2001). Learning Disabilities & Life Stories. Boston, USA: Allyn & Bacon. ISBN 9780205320103 OCLC 888129572
 
 
 "Learning Disabilities: Prevalence". Social Work, Alcohol & Drugs. University of Bedfordshire. Archived from the original on 2014-10-26. Retrieved 2014-10-18.
 "Special Educational Needs and Disability: A. Cognition and Learning Needs". teachernet. Archived from the original on 2010-05-01. Retrieved 2010-12-08.
 Vickerman, Philip (2009-07-08). "Severe Learning Difficulties". Teacher Training Resource Bank. UK. Archived from the original on 2014-10-26. Retrieved 2014-10-19. Extensive further references.

External links 
 

Mental disorders diagnosed in childhood
 
Educational psychology
Special education
Dyslexia
Childhood
Parenting